Neple  is a village in the administrative district of Gmina Terespol, within Biała Podlaska County, Lublin Voivodeship, in eastern Poland, close to the border with Belarus. The village lays in the vicinity of Krzna river and Bug river. The village has a large number of historic monuments and architecture. Caritas relief has operated a holiday resort in Neple.

References

External links
Administrative District Web
Photos "Szwajcaria Podlaska"
Google map
Photo Gallery of Church in Neple

Villages in Biała Podlaska County